Mission of Fear is a Canadian drama film, directed by Fernand Dansereau and released in 1965.

Based on The Jesuit Relations, the film dramatizes the story of the Canadian Martyrs at the Jesuit mission of Sainte-Marie among the Hurons through the reflections of Jean de Brébeuf (Alain Cuny) as he awaits his death. The cast also includes Jacques Godin, François Guillier, Jacques Kasma, Ginette Letondal, Hubert Loiselle, Yves Létourneau, Monique Mercure, Albert Millaire, Jean-Louis Millette, Jean Perraud, Jean-Guy Sabourin, Marcel Sabourin, Janine Sutto and Maurice Tremblay.

The film won the award for Best Feature Film at the Canadian Film Awards in 1966.

The film was one of the first times that bare breasts was shown on television with its airing by the Canadian Broadcasting Corporation in 1965.

References

Works cited

External links

1965 films
Canadian drama films
1965 drama films
Best Picture Genie and Canadian Screen Award winners
National Film Board of Canada films
Films directed by Fernand Dansereau
Films scored by Maurice Blackburn
First Nations films
French-language Canadian films
Canadian black-and-white films
1960s Canadian films